The fourth election to Pembrokeshire County Council was held in March 1898.  It was preceded by the 1895 election and followed by the 1901 election.

Overview of the result

In 1898 there were a number of uncontested but most seats were contested as the Conservatives sought to hold on to gains made in 1895.

Boundary changes
There were no boundary changes at this election.

Results

Ambleston

Amroth

Begelly

Burton

Camrose

Carew

Clydey

Castlemartin

Eglwyswrw

Fishguard

Haverfordwest St Martin's Hamlets

Haverfordwest, Prendergast and Uzmaston

Haverfordwest, St Thomas and Furzy Park

Haverfordwest St Martin's and St Mary's

Kilgerran

Lampeter Velfrey

Llanfyrnach

Llanwnda

Llangwm
Carrow was elected as a Liberal in 1892 and a Conservative in 1895.

Llanstadwell

Llawhaden

Maenclochog

Manorbier

Mathry

Milford
Dr Griffith had stood as a Liberal in 1892 and a Liberal Unionist in 1895.

Monkton

Narberth North

Nevern

Newport

Pembroke Ward 30

Pembroke Ward 31

Pembroke Dock Ward 32

Pembroke Dock Ward 33

Pembroke Dock Ward 34

Pembroke Dock Ward 35

Pembroke Dock Ward 36

St David's

St Dogmaels

St Ishmaels

St Issels

Slebech and Martletwy

Steynton

Tenby Ward 44

Tenby Ward 45

Walwyn's Castle

Whitchurch

Wiston

Election of aldermen
Aldermen were elected at the first meeting of the new council.

References

Pembrokeshire County Council elections
19th century in Pembrokeshire
1898 Welsh local elections